Wit Nyin Ka Kyoe is a 2017 Burmese drama film, directed by Steel (Dwe Myittar) starring Aung Ye Lin, Thinzar Wint Kyaw and Shwe Hmone Yati. The film, produced by Khayay Phyu Film Production premiered Myanmar on June 16, 2017.

Cast
Aung Ye Lin as Thit Khat Nyo
Thinzar Wint Kyaw as Khit Thamee
Shwe Hmone Yati as Shwe Pyo Phyu

References

2017 films
2010s Burmese-language films
Burmese drama films
Films shot in Myanmar
2017 drama films